Clive Braybrook (27 September 1901 – 16 July 1985) was an Australian cricketer. He played one first-class match for South Australia in 1921/22.

See also
 List of South Australian representative cricketers

References

External links
 

1901 births
1985 deaths
Australian cricketers
South Australia cricketers
Cricketers from Adelaide